Through the Storm is the thirty-second studio album by American singer Aretha Franklin. It was released on April 25, 1989, by Arista Records.

The title track (a duet with Elton John) was released as the album’s lead single, reaching number 16 on the US Billboard Hot 100. Despite the success of its lead single, the album was ultimately unsuccessful, peaking at number 55 on the Billboard 200, after spending 18 weeks on the chart. 

The follow-up single, "It Isn't, It Wasn't, It Ain't Never Gonna Be", (a duet with Whitney Houston), failed to reach the top 40 of the Billboard Hot 100, peaking at number 41.

The album’s third single, "Gimme Your Love" (a duet with  James Brown) was poorly received, failing to chart the Billboard Hot 100, and only managing a peak of number 48 on the R&B Songs chart. 

Other guest artists on the album include The Four Tops and Kenny G.

The album was remastered and re-released as an "Expanded Edition" in December 2014 by Funky Town Grooves, with bonus tracks and a second CD of remixes.

Track listing

Personnel

 Aretha Franklin – lead vocals, vocal engineer (1, 2, 4, 5), producer (3), acoustic piano (3), backing vocals (6, 7)
 Walter Afanasieff – keyboards (1, 2, 4, 5), synthesizers (1, 2, 4, 5), programming (2, 4, 5), co-producer (4, 5)
 Kitty Beethoven – backing vocals (1, 4, 5)
 Chris Botti – trumpet (6)
 Margaret Branch – backing vocals (6)
 James Brown – lead vocals (1)
 Lincoln Clapp – engineer (1, 2, 4, 5)
 Marlene Cohen – art direction
 Brenda Corbett – backing vocals (6)
 Mike Davis – trombone (6)
 George Devens – percussion (7)
 David Foster – Fender Rhodes (7), synthesizers (7)
 Four Tops – lead and backing vocals (8)
 David Frazer – engineer (1, 2, 4, 5)
 Siedah Garrett – backing vocals (2)
 Kenny G – saxophone (8)
 Gigi Gonaway – cymbal (2)
 Reggie Griffin – guitar (6)
 Kenneth Hitchcock – baritone saxophone (6)
 Yogi Horton – drums (3)
 Whitney Houston – lead vocals (4)
 Rod Hui – recording (6), mixing (6)
 Mike Iacopelli – recording (3), vocal recording (6)
 Liz Jackson – backing vocals (1)
 Skyler Jett – backing vocals (1, 5)
 Elton John – lead vocals (5)
 Louis Johnson – bass guitar (3, 7)
 Melisa Kary – backing vocals (4, 5)
 Steve Khan – guitar (3)
 Darren Klein – engineer (8), mixing (8)
 Ren Klyce – programming (1, 2, 4, 5), additional keyboards (5)
 Jerry Knight – producer (8), bass guitar (8)
 Robbie Kondor – synthesizers (3, 6), acoustic piano (6)
 Steve Kroon – percussion (3)
 Edie Lehman – backing vocals (7)
 Arif Mardin – producer (6, 7), arrangements (6, 7)
 Joe Mardin – producer (6), programming (6), sequencer (6), recording (6), mixing (6)
 Peter Max – front and back cover art
 Marti McCall – backing vocals (7)
 Sammy Merendino – electronic drums (6)
 David Paich – acoustic piano (7)
 Claytoven Richardson – backing vocals (5)
 Norman Parkinson – photography
 Jeff Porcaro – drums (7)
 John Robinson – drums (8)
 Marc Russo – saxophone (1)
 Corrado Rustici – guitar (1), rhythm guitar (5)
 "Bongo" Bob Smith – programming (1)
 Kent Smith – trumpet (6)
 Andy Snitzer – tenor saxophone (6)
 Narada Michael Walden – producer (1, 2, 4, 5), arrangements (1, 2, 4, 5), electronic drums (1), sequencer, synthesizers (2)
 Aaron Zigman – producer (8), keyboards (8), bass vocals (8)

Charts

Weekly charts

Year-end charts

References

Aretha Franklin albums
1989 albums
Albums produced by Arif Mardin
Albums produced by Narada Michael Walden
Albums produced by Jerry Knight
Arista Records albums